{{safesubst:#invoke:RfD|||month = March
|day = 15
|year = 2023
|time = 16:08
|timestamp = 20230315160833

|content=
REDIRECT New England Antiquities Research Association

}}